Stephen Adam (1848–1910) was a 19th/20th-century Scottish influential stained glass designer. He was a pioneer of modern stained glass in Scotland (in terms of colour use, and black in particular). The majority of his work is in the Pre-Raphaelite style, often with a twist towards Celtic mythology, and is mainly sited in western Scotland. Although the bulk of his work is for churches he also received many secular commissions.

Life
He was born at Bonnington Haugh north of Edinburgh (now absorbed by the city) the son of Alexander Adam. He was educated at Canonmills School.

In 1861 he was apprenticed to the Edinburgh stained glass designers, the Ballantine Brothers. He also attended art classes at the Trustees Academy in Edinburgh and Haldane's Academy in Glasgow (later to become Glasgow School of Art).

In 1865 he joined the studios of Daniel Cottier at 47 Carrick Street. In 1870 he left to set up his own business at 121 Bath Street in partnership with David Small (1846-1927). He was then living at 4 Cathkin Terrace in the Cathcart district. The partnership was dissolved in 1885.

He set up new premises at 7 Scott Street in the Garnethill district, then living at 276 Renfrew Street. Expanding rapidly he moved to 259 West George Street and moved house to 1 Holmhead Crescent back in Cathcart, before finally moving to a truly huge six-storey studio at 231 St Vincent Street in the city centre.

From 1889 he trained other stained glass artists including his son, Stephen Adam, David Gauld and Alf Webster. In 1896 the firm became Adam & Son but a family dispute caused them to split in 1904 (as Webster only joined in 1905 it was not a jealousy of the son as some speculate).

He died at Bath Street in Glasgow in August 1910 and his work was continued by Alf Webster.
Webster's genius was cut short whilst serving in the Gordon Highlanders in the First World War when he was fatally wounded in the battlefield and died at Le Touquet Red Cross Station in 1915.

Publications
Stained Glass:Its History and Development (1877)
Truth in Decorative Art: Stained Glass Medieval and Modern (1896)

Notable works

Paisley Abbey
Kidston memorial window, Cambuslang
Tobias Smollett window and Heritors windows at Bonhill (1880)
Clark memorial, Paisley
Belhaven Parish Church, Glasgow (with Andrew Wells) (1877)
Industry panels at Maryhill Burgh Halls
Industry panels at the People's Palace, Glasgow
The Life of Christ: New Kilpatrick Church, Bearsden
The Baptism of Christ, Henderson Memorial window etc. Lecropt Church, Stirlingshire (1907)
Shipping panels, boardroom of the Clydeport Authority
Kilmore Church, Dervaig on the Isle of Mull (1905 onwards) completed by Alf Webster
The Works of Mercy, North Berwick Parish Church
Charity and Music windows Craigrownie Church, Loch Long
St Columba's Church, Largs (1892)
Clark Memorial Church, Largs (1892)
St andrew's Church, St Andrews Square, Glasgow
Baptismal window, Dumbarton St Augustine's Episcopal Church
Annan Town Hall
Inverness Town House
Imperial Bar, Howard Street, Glasgow
Carnegie Library, Ayr
Carnegie Library, Dumfries
Sick Children's Hospital, Glasgow
Dowanhill Church, Glasgow
New Mental Hospital, Glasgow
Glasswork in Devonshire Gardens
Glasswork for Sir Charles Cayzer at Gartmore House
Broughton House in Kirkcudbright for his friend Edward Atkinson Hornel
The Magi, Alloway Church
Pollokshields Congregational Church
Glasgow Royal Infirmary, ante-chapel
St Michael and All Angels, Helensburgh
Royal Prince Albert Hospital, New South Wales
Works in the various mansions of the Pullar family of Pullars of Perth
Works in the various mansions of the Coats family of Pullars of Paisley
Stained glass at St John's Kirk, Perth 
St James Episcopal Church, Leith (removed and now in private ownership)

References

1848 births
1910 deaths
Artists from Edinburgh
Stained glass artists and manufacturers
Scottish artists